Operation Bayonet may refer to:
 Another name for Operation Wrath of God, a 1972 covert operation directed by the Mossad to assassinate individuals involved in the Munich massacre of that year
 Operation Bayonet (darknet), a multinational law enforcement operation culminating in 2017, targeting the AlphaBay and Hansa darknet markets